OFK Beograd is a professional football club based in Karaburma, Belgrade, Serbia.

Managers

Notes

References

External links
 

 
OFK Beograd